King's Highway 62, commonly referred to as Highway 62, is a provincially maintained highway in the Canadian province of Ontario. The highway travels south–north from Highway 33 at Bloomfield in Prince Edward County, through Belleville, Madoc and Bancroft, to Maynooth, where it ends at a junction with Highway 127. Prior to 1997, the route continued north and east of Maynooth through Cobermere, Barry's Bay, Killaloe, Round Lake and Bonnechere to Highway 17 in Pembroke. This section of highway was redesignated Hastings Highlands Municipal Road62, Renfrew County Road62, and Renfrew County Road58.

Highway62 was designated by the Department of Highways (DHO), predecessor to the modern Ministry of Transportation, in 1937 along the Madoc–Pembroke Road between those two communities. A gap existed along the route between Barry's Bay and Round Lake for several decades pending construction of a new road which never took place. The highway was extended south from Madoc to Highway 14 at Foxboro in 1966. Two years later, Highway 521 was renumbered as part of Highway62, and a concurrency established with Highway 60 between Barry's Bay and Killaloe, uniting the discontinuous sections. The northernmost portion of the route was renumbered Highway 148 in 1982.

Route description 

Highway62 begins in the community of Bloomfield at a junction with Highway33, the Loyalist Parkway, with which it shares a common terminus at Wellington Street. The first  of the road north of that intersection is maintained under a Connecting Link agreement.
Exiting Bloomfield, the highway winds north through several communities in Prince Edward County, including Huffs Corners where the Huff Estates Winery is located, Crofton, Mountain View and Fenwood Gardens before crossing the Norris Whitney Bridge over the Bay of Quinte into Belleville. It skirts the CFD Mountain View military base between Crofton and Mountain View.

Within urbanized Belleville, Highway62 serves as the primary north–south route. It is maintained under a Connecting Link agreement from the northern end of the Norris Whitney Bridge to the southern end of the Highway 401 interchange. The Connecting Link follows Bay Bridge Road, Dundas Street, Pinnacle Street, and Front Street North.
Prior to crossing the Moira River in downtown Belleville, Highway62 encounters what was, until 1997, the southern terminus of Highway 37 at Station Street.

After crossing over Highway401 at the Exit543 interchange, Highway62 exits the urban portion of Belleville. It travels straight north until its path is interrupted by the Moira River approaching Foxboro; the highway bypasses to the west of that community along the boundary between Belleville and Quite West, meeting the southern terminus of former Highway14 at Doucette Road. The former route through Foxboro is known as Ashley Street. Continuing along the bypass, the highway merges onto the Madoc Road at Halloway.

Within the village of Madoc, Highway62 is maintained under a Connecting Link agreement as it passes through the centre of town. The Connecting Link begins just north of Charles Street and extends to south of Highway7.
Now following the Hastings Colonization Road, an early pioneer settlement road,
the highway travels straight north into Madoc Township, passing through Eldorado, site of the first gold rush in Ontario.
At Keller Bridge, the highway enters the Canadian Shield, with farmland giving way to thick forests and frequent rock outcroppings for the remainder of its length. The next  of Highway62 bypasses the Hastings Colonization Road through the particularly barren townships of Tudor and Cashel and Limerick, with a combined population of under 1,000.
Only the communities of Bannockburn and Millbridge break the endless forests.

Entering the larger rural Town of Bancroft, Highway62 travels through the community of L'Amable and around the lake of the same name. It enters the village of Bancroft, where it is maintained as a Connecting Link as it meanders alongside the York River. The Connecting Link begins south of Bay Lake Road and stretches  through the village to Victoria Drive.
Within the centre of the village, Highway62 intersects and is briefly concurrent with Highway 28 along Bridge Street, crossing the York River. South of this concurrency, it is known as Mill Street, while north of the concurrency it is known as Hastings Street.

Parting ways with the York River, Highway62 enters Hastings Highlands and passes through the communities of York River and Birds Creek, which form a continuous stretch of urban development along with the village of Bancroft. The highway then returns to thick forests, although the occasional farm dots the journey north, mostly surrounding the Hickey Settlement. At the Peterson Colonization Road, the highway makes a sharp curve east and enters Maynooth. It ends at the junction with Highway127, with which it shares a terminus. Prior to 1997, Highway62 continued east and north along what is now known as Hastings Highlands Municipal Road62, Renfrew County Road 62 and Renfrew County Road58 via Cobermere, Barry's Bay, Killaloe, Round Lake Centre and Bonnechere to Highway17 in Pembroke.

History 

Highway62 was first assumed by the DHO in 1937. On April1 of that year, the DHO merged with the Department of Northern Development.
Following the merger, many new trunk roads through central and northern Ontario were designated as provincial highways. One of these was the Madoc–Pembroke Road, which became Highway62 on August11, 1937.
Originally, the route followed the Hastings Colonization Road, which was quickly determined to be too rough to upgrade. A new alignment was constructed to the east between Millbridge and L'Amable in the late 1930s. This bypass was opened to traffic on March22, 1939.
Subsequently, the bypassed portion of the highway was decommissioned on April 11.

At the time of its assumption, Highway62 was split into two segments. The first section travelled from Madoc to Barry's Bay, the second from Pembroke to the community of Bonnechere, on the northwestern shore of Round Lake. It was originally planned to unite these segments by building a new highway mostly following the route of Paugh Lake Road.
This section was never built, and so the two sections of Highway62 remained separated for a quarter century.

Several changes occurred in the Round Lake area through the 1950s and 1960s. In 1956, Highway521 was designated by the DHO between Brudenell and the northern segment of Highway62 at Bonnechere Provincial Park.
Four years later, Highway62 was extended concurrently along Highway60 between Barry's Bay and Killaloe and north along Highway 521 to Tramore on the southeast side of Round Lake.
The remainder of Highway521, between Tramore and Bonnechere Provincial Park, was renumbered Highway62 in 1967, reuniting the two sections of the route.

Within Pembroke, Highway62 initially ended at the intersection of Trafalgar Road and Pembroke Street West.
The completion of the Des Allumettes Bridge southeast of Pembroke, in 1957, resulted in the extension of Highway62 to the Quebec boundary in 1960, almost entirely a concurrency with Highway17.
In 1966, Highway62 was extended south of Madoc to Highway14 at Foxboro when several Hastings County roads were taken over by the DHO on April1 of that year.

The Norris Whitney Bridge over the Bay of Quinte was opened in December 1982, replacing the original 1891 swing bridge. Portions of the original causeway can still be seen alongside the current structure.
Shortly thereafter, by 1984, the section of Highway14 south of Foxboro to Highway33 at Bloomfield was renumbered as part of Highway62.
Discussions have been underway since 2017 to build a second bridge, widening the highway from two to four lanes.

As part of a series of budget cuts initiated by premier Mike Harris under his Common Sense Revolution platform in 1995, numerous highways deemed to no longer be of significance to the provincial network were decommissioned and responsibility for the routes transferred to a lower level of government, a process referred to as downloading. Portions of Highway62 were consequently transferred to local jurisdictions in 1997 and 1998. On April1, 1997, the section from the Laurentian Valley – Killaloe, Hagarty and Richards boundary east to Highway17 was transferred to Renfrew County.
Renfrew quickly redesignated it as County Road58.
On January1, 1998, the section northeast of Highway127 in Maynooth was transferred to Hastings and Renfrew counties. The concurrency with Highway60 was discontinued as a result of this transfer.
Hastings County subsequently transferred its portion of the road to the townships of Monteagle and Bangor, Wicklow and McClure on April15, 1998.

Major intersections

References 
Notes

Sources

External links 

 Highway 62 - Length and Route
 Highway 62 Pictures and Information
 Preliminary Design and Environmental Assessment Study for Highway 62 Norris Whitney Bridge Rehabilitation / Replacement

062
Transport in Belleville, Ontario